Miss USA 1998 was the 47th Miss USA pageant, held in Shreveport, Louisiana in March, 1998.   The preliminary competition was held on March 6, 1998, and the final competition on March 10, 1998.  The event was won by Shawnae Jebbia of Massachusetts, who was crowned by outgoing titleholder Brandi Sherwood of Idaho.

The pageant was held in Shreveport, Louisiana for the second consecutive year; unusually Shreveport would also host the Miss Teen USA pageant later the same year.  Owner Donald Trump had initially suggested that the event would be moved to New York City, however an agreement was reached in November 1997 for the pageant to stay in Louisiana.  During the two weeks that the delegates were in Shreveport the city and local companies benefitted from the extra business generated by the pageant and by the publicity offered by three minutes of promotion during the live broadcast.  The expected worldwide audience for the pageant was 300 million people.

The pageant was hosted by The Young and the Restless star J. Eddie Peck for the only time, and Ali Landry, Miss USA 1996 and Julie Moran, co-host of Entertainment Tonight, offered colour commentary.  She Moves provided entertainment during the competition.  Executive producers Susan Winston and Dan Funk were chosen to produce the live telecast, broadcast on CBS.

During the competition, in a pre-taped segment, Halle Berry, Miss Ohio USA 1986 and first runner-up to Christy Fichtner at Miss USA 1986, was awarded a Distinguished Achievement Award for her achievements in acting.

Results

Placements

Special awards
Miss Congenality: Vera Morris (North Carolina)
Miss Photogenic: Sonja Glenn (South Carolina)
Style Award: Meredith Blankenship (Virginia)
Best in Swimsuit: Shawnae Jebbia (Massachusetts)

Scores

Final competition

 Winner
 First runner-up
 Second runner-up
 Finalists

Delegates
The Miss USA 1998 delegates were:

 Alabama – Paige Brooks
 Alaska – Pamela Kott
 Arizona – Stacey Kole
 Arkansas – Kami Tice
 California – Shauna Gambill
 Colorado – Michelle Stanley
 Connecticut – Kristina Hughes
 Delaware – Sherri Davis
 District of Columbia – Zanice Lyles
 Florida – Jamie Converse
 Georgia – Edlyn Lewis
 Hawaii – Tiffini Hercules
 Idaho – Melinda Grasmick
 Illinois – Mandy Lane
 Indiana – Nicole Llewelyn
 Iowa – Jamie Solinger
 Kansas – Cammie Morrisseau
 Kentucky – Nancy Bradley
 Louisiana – Debbie Delhomme
 Maine – Kathy Morse
 Maryland – Maria Lynn Sheriff
 Massachusetts – Shawnae Jebbia
 Michigan – Johnelle Ryan
 Minnesota – Josan Hengen
 Mississippi – Angela Whatley
 Missouri – Melanie Breedlove
 Montana – Reno Wittman
 Nebraska – Jennifer Naro
 Nevada – Tammie Rankin
 New Hampshire – Nadia Semerdjiev
 New Jersey – Kelli Parz
 New Mexico – Maya Strunk
 New York – Susan Wisdom
 North Carolina – Vera Morris
 North Dakota – Alison Nesemeir
 Ohio – Cynthia Madden
 Oklahoma – Anne-Marie Dixon
 Oregon – Kara Jones
 Pennsylvania – Kimberly Jaycox
 Rhode Island – Connie Harrolle
 South Carolina – Sonja Glenn
 South Dakota – Lori O’Brien
 Tennessee – Amy Neely
 Texas – Holly Mills
 Utah – Melissa Leigh Anderson
 Vermont – Cathy Bliss
 Virginia – Meredith Blankenship
 Washington – Natasha Vantramp
 West Virginia – Susan Booth
 Wisconsin – Michelle Altman
 Wyoming – Megan Wigert

Historical significance
 Massachusetts wins competition for the first time and surpasses its previous highest placement in 1978. Also becoming in the 26th state who does it for the first time.
 California earns the 1st runner-up position for the fourth time. The last time it placed this was in 1988. Also it reaches the highest placement since Shannon Marketic won in 1992.
 Missouri earns the 2nd runner-up position for the third time. The last time it placed this was in 1963.
 Texas finishes as Top 5 for the third time and repeats the same placement as the last year 1997.
 Utah finishes as Top 5 for the second time and repeats the same placement as the last year 1997.
 States that placed in semifinals the previous year were Texas and Utah.
 Texas placed for the seventh consecutive year.
 Utah placed for the third consecutive year.
 Louisiana and Michigan last placed in 1996.
 Massachusetts and Missouri last placed in 1995.
 Virginia last placed in 1994.
 California last placed in 1993.
 Arizona last placed in 1992.
 Washington last placed in 1983.
 Oklahoma breaks an ongoing streak of placements since 1995.
 Tennessee breaks an ongoing streak of placements since 1996.
 For the second time since 1984, the pageant featured two former Miss Teen USA titleholders. Miss Teen USA 1983 and 1984 competed in the Miss USA 1984 pageant as "Miss Teen USA" plus the year that they won the title.  This time, the two Miss Teen USA winners had to win their state titles first.  This became the first time that two former Miss Teen USAs represented their states at Miss USA after the rule change took place in 1985.
 Miss Teen USA 1994 Shauna Gambill, as Miss California USA 1998, placed 1st runner-up.
 Miss Teen USA 1992 Jamie Solinger, as Miss Iowa USA 1998, did not place.

Crossovers
Eleven delegates had previously competed in either the Miss Teen USA or Miss America pageants.

Delegates who had previously held a Miss Teen USA state title were:
Melissa Leigh Anderson (Utah) - Miss Utah Teen USA 1990
Catherine Bliss (Vermont) - Miss New York Teen USA 1990
Nicole Llewellen (Indiana) - Miss Indiana Teen USA 1992 (Semi-finalist at Miss Teen USA 1992)
Jamie Solinger (Iowa) - Miss Iowa Teen USA 1992, Miss Teen USA 1992
Tammie Rankin (Nevada) - Miss Nevada Teen USA 1993
Melanie Breedlove (Missouri) - Miss Missouri Teen USA 1993
Kelli Paarz (New Jersey) - Miss New Jersey Teen USA 1994  (Semi-finalist at Miss Teen USA 1994)
Shauna Gambill (California) - Miss California Teen USA 1994, Miss Teen USA 1994
Allison Nesemeier (North Dakota) - Miss North Dakota Teen USA 1994
Anne-Marie Dixon (Oklahoma) - Miss Illinois Teen USA 1995  (Finalist at Miss Teen USA 1995)

Delegate who had previously held a Miss America state title were:
Michelle Stanley (Colorado) - Miss Colorado 1996

Delegate who competed at Miss World 1998:
Shauna Gambill (California)

See also
Miss Teen USA 1998
Miss Universe 1998

References
  
"Massachusetts Makes It." Pageant News Bureau. 10 March 1998. 
"Thoughts of Miss USA 1998."  Tom's Page of Miss Universe Mania.

External links
Official Miss USA website

1998
March 1998 events in the United States
1998 beauty pageants
1998 in Louisiana